David Sulkovsky (born 14 June 1978) is a German former professional ice hockey player. He spent 15 years playing with various teams in the Deutsche Eishockey Liga (DEL).

References

External links
 
 

1978 births
Living people
German ice hockey left wingers
Hannover Scorpions players